PalaSele is an indoor sporting arena located in Eboli, Italy.  The capacity of the arena is 8,000 spectators.  It hosts indoor sporting events such as basketball and volleyball, and also hosts concerts.

External links
Stadium information

Indoor arenas in Italy
Sports venues in Campania
Buildings and structures in the Province of Salerno